Rhododendron sinogrande (凸尖杜鹃) is a species of flowering plant in the family Ericaceae.

Description
In late spring it bears large trusses of pale yellow or cream flowers, spotted with maroon on the interior.

Cultivation
In cultivation in the UK Rhododendron sinogrande has gained the Royal Horticultural Society's Award of Garden Merit. It is hardy down to  but like most rhododendrons it requires a sheltered spot in dappled shade, and an acid soil enriched with leaf mould.

References 

sinogrande
Taxa named by William Wright Smith
Taxa named by Isaac Bayley Balfour